Crupina crupinastrum, also known as false saw wort, is a species of annual herb in the family Asteraceae. They have a self-supporting growth form and simple, broad leaves. Flowers are visited by scarce swallowtail, Hoplitis, Trichodes, and brimstone. Individuals can grow to 40 cm.

Sources

References 

Flora of Malta
Cynareae